Experimental and Clinical Psychopharmacology is a peer-reviewed scientific journal published by the American Psychological Association. It was established in 1993 and covers research in clinical psychology. The current editor-in-chief is William W. Stoops (University of Kentucky Department of Behavioral Science).

The journal has implemented the Transparency and Openness Promotion (TOP) Guidelines.  The TOP Guidelines provide structure to research planning and reporting and aim to make research more transparent, accessible, and reproducible.

Abstracting and indexing 
The journal is abstracted and indexed by MEDLINE/PubMed and the Social Sciences Citation Index. According to the Journal Citation Reports, the journal has a 2020 impact factor of 3.157.

References

External links

American Psychological Association academic journals
Clinical psychology journals
English-language journals
Bimonthly journals
Pharmacology journals
Publications established in 1993